Chovazhiyeh (also Romanized as Chovāzhīyeh; also known as Chūzhāyeh and Chūzhīyeh) is a village in Kharajgil Rural District, Asalem District, Talesh County, Gilan Province, Iran. At the 2006 census, its population was 62, in 15 families.

References 

Populated places in Talesh County